Tatobotys vibrata is a moth in the family Crambidae. It was described by Edward Meyrick in 1929. It is found in French Polynesia, where it has been recorded from the Marquesas Islands.

References

Moths described in 1929
Spilomelinae